Retinal guanylyl cyclase 1 also known as guanylate cyclase 2D, retinal is an enzyme that in humans is encoded by the GUCY2D (guanylate cyclase 2D) gene.

Function 

This gene encodes a retina-specific guanylate cyclase, which is a member of the membrane guanylyl cyclase family. Like other membrane guanylyl cyclases, this enzyme has a hydrophobic amino-terminal signal sequence followed by a large extracellular domain, a single membrane spanning domain, a kinase homology domain, and a guanylyl cyclase catalytic domain. In contrast to other membrane guanylyl cyclases, this enzyme is not activated by natriuretic peptides.

The nomenclature for members of the Gucy2 gene family is not consistent across species. In many mammals, including mice and rats, the Gucy2d gene encodes a related protein – GC-D – that is specifically expressed in a subpopulation of olfactory sensory neurons. This gene is a pseudogene in humans and most other primates. In rodents, the corresponding (orthologous) gene to human GUCY2D is Gucy2e.

Clinical significance 

Mutations in this gene result in Leber's congenital amaurosis and cone-rod dystrophy-6 diseases.

References